These are the official results of the 2008 Ibero-American Championships in Athletics which took place on June 13–15, 2008 in Iquique, Chile.

Men's results

100 meters

Heats – June 13Wind:Heat 1: -1.6 m/s, Heat 2: -1.1 m/s

Final – June 13Wind:-2.3 m/s

200 meters

Heats – June 15Wind:Heat 1: -0.5 m/s, Heat 2: -1.7 m/s

Final – June 15

400 meters

Heats – June 13

Final – June 14

800 meters

Heats – June 13

Final – June 14

1500 meters
June 15

3000 meters
June 14

5000 meters
June 13

110 meters hurdles

Heats – June 15Wind:Heat 1: -1.3 m/s, Heat 2: -1.1 m/s

Final – June 15Wind:-2.0 m/s

400 meters hurdles

Heats – June 13

Final – June 14

3000 meters steeplechase
June 13

4 x 100 meters relay
June 15

4 x 400 meters relay
June 15

20,000 meters walk
June 15

High jump
June 15

Pole vault
June 14

Long jump
June 13

Triple jump
June 15

Shot put
June 13

Discus throw
June 15

Hammer throw
June 14

Javelin throw
June 14

Decathlon
June 14–15

Women's results

100 meters

Heats – June 13Wind:Heat 1: -1.9 m/s, Heat 2: -2.5 m/s

Final – June 13Wind:-1.5 m/s

200 meters
June 15Wind: -0.5 m/s

400 meters

Heats – June 13

Final – June 14

800 meters

Heats – June 13

Final – June 14

1500 meters
June 15

3000 meters
June 14

5000 meters
June 13

100 meters hurdles
June 14Wind: -0.5 m/s

400 meters hurdles
June 14

3000 meters steeplechase
June 13

4 x 100 meters relay
June 15

4 x 400 meters relay
June 15

10,000 meters walk
June 14

High jump
June 14

Pole vault
June 13

Long jump
June 14

Triple jump
June 15

Shot put
June 13

Discus throw
June 15

Hammer throw
June 14

Javelin throw
June 13

Heptathlon
June 14–15

References

Results:
Day 1 (archived)
Day 2 (archived)
Day 3 (archived)

Ibero-American Championships Results
Events at the Ibero-American Championships in Athletics